The 56th Cinema Audio Society Awards was held on January 25, 2020, virtually, honoring outstanding achievement in sound mixing in film and television of 2019.

Winners and nominees

References

2019 film awards
2019 television awards
Cinema Audio Society Awards
2019 in American cinema
2019 guild awards